Sonny Nickle (born 4 May 1969) is an English former professional rugby league footballer who played in the 1980s, 1990s and 2000s.

Background
Sonny Nickle was born in Leeds, West Riding of Yorkshire, England. He is the youngest of four brothers.

Playing career
Nickle joined St Helens from Sheffield Eagles in July 1991. St Helens paid Sheffield an initial fee of £80,000, set by an independent tribunal, and an additional £25,000 after Nickle was selected to play for Great Britain.

Sonny Nickle played  in St Helens 4–5 defeat by Wigan in the 1992 Lancashire Cup Final during the 1992–93 season at Knowsley Road, St. Helens on Sunday 18 October 1992.

In 1995, he was part of the package put together by St Helens to bring Paul Newlove to the club from the Bradford Bulls. Sonny Nickle was an athletic forward who was a powerful runner. He enjoyed the distinction of representing Great Britain on six occasions.

Nickle returned to St Helens in 1999, and played in their 1999 Super League Grand Final victory over Bradford Bulls. Nickle appeared from the bench in the Saints' 2000 Super League Grand Final victory over Wigan Warriors.

In September 2001, Nickle was suspended for six months for a tackle on Leeds Rhinos hooker Robbie Mears, which broke the Leeds player's jaw. The suspension was changed to a nine-match ban following an appeal. The club attempted to shorten the ban by allowing Nickle to sign a short-term contract with Northern Ford Premiership side Barrow Border Raiders, whose new season started earlier than St Helens. When Nickle re-signed with Saints, the RFL confirmed that Nickle had to serve the remainder of his ban, as the matches with Barrow would not count towards his suspension.

References

External links
Saints Heritage Society profile

1969 births
Living people
Bradford Bulls players
England national rugby league team players
English rugby league players
Great Britain national rugby league team players
Hunslet R.L.F.C. players
Leigh Leopards players
People from Belle Isle, Leeds
Rugby league players from Leeds
Rugby league props
Rugby league second-rows
Sheffield Eagles (1984) players
St Helens R.F.C. players